Jahangirnameh ( "Story of Jahangir") is an epic poem in the Persian language which relates the story of Jahangir son of Rostam. It is composed in the same meter as the Shahnameh. The author mentions his name as Qāsem-e Mādeḥ in one of the last couplets of the poem. Composed in Herat, it contains nearly 3,600 couplets.  It was published in Bombay (Mumbai) in 1309/1886.

It should not be confused with another work often called the "Jahangirnameh" but also the Tuzk-e-Jahangiri.  This is the autobiography or memoirs of the Mughal Emperor Jahangir (1569-1627) in Persian prose.

Unlike other poems in Persian, Jahangirnameh contains relatively high number of Arabic loanwords, and the stories also were under Islamic influence. According to Zabihullah Safa, this indicates that the poem is composed in late 6th century AH or early 7th century AH.  
The poem seems to be largely an imitation of the Borzu Nama. In both stories, Rostam's son is brought up in Turan by Turanians and unknowingly fights against his Iranian compatriots. But at the end, he is recognized by Iranians and then joins the Iranian army.  Later he is killed by a demon when hunting.

References

Epic poems in Persian
Persian_mythology
Indian poems